Mieczysław or Mečislovas (Lithuanian) is a Slavic name of Polish origin and consists of two parts: miecz "sword", and sław "glory, famous". Feminine form: Mieczysława. Alternate form: Mieszko.

This name may refer to:

People

Mečislovas
Mečislovas Gedvilas, Lithuanian Soviet politician, first Prime Minister of the Lithuanian SSR
Mečislovas Reinys, was the Lithuanian Roman Catholic archbishop of the Vilnius, Minsk and Tiddi dioceses, a professor at Vytautas Magnus University

Mieczysław
Mieczysław Batsch, Polish footballer
Mieczysław Boruta-Spiechowicz, a Polish military officer, a general of the Polish Army and a notable member of the post-war anti-communist opposition in Poland
Mieczysława Ćwiklińska, a Polish film actress, stage actor and singer. She was often nicknamed Lińska or Amiette.
Mieczysław Fogg, Polish singer
Mieczysław Garsztka, Polish aviator, flying ace in the German Air Force in World War I
Mieczysław Halka Ledóchowski, a Cardinal Ledóchowski
Mieczysław Horszowski, Polish pianist
Mieczysław Jagielski, Polish communist politician and economist
Mieczysław Janowski,  Polish politician and Member of the European Parliament
Mieczysław Kalenik, Polish actor
Mieczysław Karłowicz, Polish composer and conductor
Mieczysław Kawalec, Polish officer in the anti-communist resistance
Mieczysław Mickiewicz, Polish-Ukrainian politician
Mieczysław Moczar, Polish communist who played a prominent role in the history of the Polish People's Republic
Mieczysław Mokrzycki, Polish Catholic archbishop
Mieczysław Morański, Polish actor, famous for cartoon voice-overs
Mieczysław Munz, Polish-American pianist
Miguel Najdorf, Polish-born Argentine chess grandmaster of Jewish origin, famous for his Najdorf Variation
Mieczysław Niedziałkowski, Polish writer and activist executed during the German AB-Aktion in Poland
Mieczysław Nowicki, Polish Olympic medalist in bicycle racing and Minister of Sport
Mieczysław Połukard, Polish speedway rider and coach
Mieczysław "Mietek" Pemper, a Polish-born Jewish Holocaust survivor who assisted Oskar Schindler in his rescue activities during World War II
Mieczysław Rakowski, Polish communist politician, historian and journalist
Mieczysław Zygfryd Słowikowski, Polish army officer
Mieczysław Smorawiński, Polish general who died in the Katyn massacre
 Mieczyslaw Solomonowicz, changed his name to Michael Sela (born 1924), Israeli immunologist; President of the Weizmann Institute of Science
Mieczysław Stoor, Polish film actor
Mieczysław Demetriusz Sudowski, writer on esoteric, spiritual and mystical topics
Mieczysław Weinberg, important Soviet composer of Polish-Jewish origin
Mieczysław Wolfke, Polish physicist
Mieczysław Zub, Polish serial killer

Fiction
Mieczysław "Mickey Doyle" Kuzik, from the television series Boardwalk Empire
Mieczysław "Stiles" Stilinski, a character from the 2011 television series Teen Wolf.

See also
 Mieszko, possible diminutive form
 Mstislav (given name)
 Polish name
 Slavic names

External links
 http://www.behindthename.com/name/mieczysl16aw

Polish masculine given names
Slavic masculine given names